André Stil (1 April 1921 – 3 September 2004) was a French novelist, short story writer, occasional poet, and political activist. A lifelong militant, he became a member of the French Communist Party in 1940, and remained loyal to the party.

Life

Born in Hergnies, Nord, a small town in the coal-mining region of northern France, Stil was educated at the University of Lille, earning a degree in philosophy.  He taught at the University from 1941 to 1944.  Having joined the Communist Party in 1940, he then held a series of increasingly senior editorial positions with communist newspapers. He was secretary-general of Liberté until 1949, then editor-in-chief of Ce soir.  He served as editor of the party's main newspaper, L'Humanité, until 1956, continuing to contribute thereafter, and from 1950 to 1970 he was a member of the French Communist Party's central committee.

Beginning in 1949, he published some fifty volumes, comprising mainly socialist realist novels, but also short stories and a volume of verse.  Supported by Louis Aragon, he won the Stalin Prize for his trilogy The First Clash (1951–1953).  He won the Grand Prix du Roman Populaire, was awarded the Legion d'Honneur, and in 1977 was elected one of the ten members of the Academie Goncourt.

In 1956 he published a report from the Hungarian Revolution, describing an apparent mass murder of Hungarian communists. However Peter Fryer, a British journalist and Marxist who, unlike Stil was present during the Revolution and Soviet crack-down, questioned Stil's account arguing that 'Stil [was] obviously performing the disagreeable task of a propagandist making the most of a small number of atrocities.' Indeed, Fryer refuted Stil's account pointing out that those killed were in fact members of the hated AVH secret police.

Works

His first novel, The Word `Coalminer', Comrade (1949) launched his enduring themes of working class life and militant communist politics.  This was followed by a short story collection, The Seine has Taken to the Sea (1950) and his prize-winning trilogy The First Clash (1951–1953).  This tells the story of the resistance of dock workers to the arrival of an American arms ship and contains detailed accounts of domestic working-class life.  Anti-Americanism and the French-Algerian problem were important themes in his work through the 1950s.  He returned to his coal-mining background repeatedly in his fiction; one of his last novels was Coal Dust on the Snow (1996).  In addition to his prolific fiction, he wrote a critical work, Towards Socialist Realism, and an autobiography, A Life Spent Writing.  He also wrote scripts for television.

List of works

 Au mot amour
 Beau comme un homme
 Bélesta
 Conte du premier œuf
 De eerste stoot 3 dedlen  	
 Dieu est un enfant
 Fleurs par erreur
 Gazelle
 La neige fumée
 La question du bonneur est posée 1- le blé égyptien
 L'ami dans le miroir
 Le Médecin de charme
 L'autre monde, etc.
 L'Homme de cœur
 L'homme fleur	
 Le foudroyage
 Le médecin de charme
 Le mot mineur camarades ...
 Le Mouvement de la terre
 Le roman de Constance 
 Le premier choc - au château d'eau
 Les oiseaux migrateurs 
 Les Quartiers d'été
 Malaguanyat
 Maxime et Anne 
 Nous nous aimerons demain
 Paris avec nous le premier choc
 Pêche à la plume
 Pierwski starcie 2 volume
 Pignon sur ciel
 Quand Robespierre et Danton inventaient la France
 Qui ?
 Romansonge
 Soixante-quatre coquelicots
 Une histoire pour chaque matin
 Une vie à écrire

References

External links

1921 births
2004 deaths
People from Nord (French department)
20th-century French novelists
Stalin Prize winners
Officiers of the Légion d'honneur
French Communist Party members
French male novelists
Communist writers
Occasional poets